The 1961–62 Ice hockey Bundesliga season was the fourth season of the Ice hockey Bundesliga, the top level of ice hockey in Germany. Eight teams participated in the league, and EC Bad Tolz won the championship.

First round

Final round

Qualification round

Relegation

References

Eishockey-Bundesliga seasons
Bund
Ger